The Cabbie's Song is a 1936 German romantic drama film directed by E. W. Emo and starring Paul Hörbiger, Gusti Huber, and Franz Schafheitlin. The film offers a nostalgic view of Vienna during the old Imperial Era. It takes its name from a popular Viennese song, and its set in the 1880s at the time of the song's composition. 
It was made at the Bavaria Studios in Munich and partly shot on location in Budapest and Vienna. The film's sets were designed by the art director Emil Hasler.

Cast

References

Bibliography 
 Klaus, Ulrich J. Deutsche Tonfilme: Jahrgang 1936. Klaus-Archiv, 1988.

External links 
 

1936 films
1936 romantic drama films
Films of Nazi Germany
1930s German-language films
Films directed by E. W. Emo
Films set in Vienna
Films shot in Vienna
Bavaria Film films
Films set in the 1880s
German historical films
1930s historical films
Films scored by Nico Dostal
German black-and-white films
German romantic drama films
1930s German films